Musa Juwara (born 26 December 2001) is a Gambian professional footballer who plays as a striker for Danish Superliga club OB, on loan from Bologna. He represents the Gambia national team.

Club career

Early career
Juwara was born in the Gambia and embarked as a migrant to Italy in 2016. There, he started playing football with Virtus Avigliano and after a successful season was scouted by Chievo. He was banned from transferring to Chievo by the FIGC, but he challenged the hearing and eventually joined them.

Juwara briefly joined Torino F.C. on loan for the 2019 Torneo di Viareggio, where he scored 3 goals in 3 matches, before returning to Verona for the end of the season.

He made his professional debut for Chievo in a 0–0 Serie A tie with Frosinone Calcio on 25 May 2019, coming on as a 79th-minute substitute for Manuel Pucciarelli.

Bologna
On 8 July 2019, Juwara signed a deal with Bologna. Although he was assigned to their Under-19 squad for the 2019–20 season, he quickly began falling into Siniša Mihajlović's first-team plans, making his debut on December 4 by playing the full 90 minutes in a 4-0 Coppa Italia defeat at the hands of Udinese.

His Serie A debut for the club came on February 4, coming on as an 86th-minute substitute for fellow-countryman Musa Barrow in a 3–2 victory at Roma. This would be followed by appearances off the bench against Genoa and Udinese, before the competition was halted on March 9 as a result of the COVID-19 pandemic.

After the competition resumed he would be given a lot more first-team opportunities as a result of the heavy playing schedule and new 5-substitute rule, impressing in the first game back in a 2–0 loss at Juventus on June 22, where he replaced Riccardo Orsolini in the 82nd minute.

His first Serie A goal came on July 5, in a convincing performance at San Siro, where he would score the equaliser and secure the sending-off of Alessandro Bastoni in a 2–1 win over Inter Milan.

Loan to Boavista
On 6 October 2020, he joined Portuguese club Boavista on loan with an option to purchase.

Loan to Crotone
On 13 July 2021, he moved on loan to Crotone. On 31 January 2022, the loan was terminated early.

Loan to OB
On 19 January 2023, Juwara joined OB in Denmark on loan until 31 December 2023, with an option to buy.

International career
Juwara debuted with Gambia in a friendly 1–0 win over Congo on 9 October 2020.

References

External links
 
 Lega Serie A Profile

2001 births
Living people
Association football midfielders
Gambian footballers
The Gambia international footballers
A.C. ChievoVerona players
Bologna F.C. 1909 players
Boavista F.C. players
F.C. Crotone players
Odense Boldklub players
Serie A players
Serie B players
Primeira Liga players
Gambian expatriate footballers
Gambian expatriate sportspeople in Italy
Expatriate footballers in Italy
Gambian expatriate sportspeople in Portugal
Expatriate footballers in Portugal
Gambian expatriate sportspeople in Denmark
Expatriate men's footballers in Denmark